is an opera in three acts composed by Nicola Porpora to an Italian-language libretto by Nicola Coluzzi. It premiered in February 1732 at the Teatro Capranica in Rome with an all-male cast. The leading male roles were taken by two of the most prominent castrato singers of the 18th century—Domenico Annibali as Germanico and Caffarelli as his nemesis Arminio. The female roles were portrayed by castrati en travesti. The opera's story is a fictionalised account of the Roman general Germanicus and is set in Germania Inferior during 14 AD. Germanico in Germania was very popular in its day but fell into obscurity until it was revived in 2015 at the Innsbruck Festival of Early Music.

Recordings
Some of the opera's bravura arias have been recorded by the singers Simone Kermes ("Empi, se mai disciolgo"), Max Emanuel Cenčić ("Qual turbine che scende"),  ("Qual turbine che scende") and Cecilia Bartoli ("Parto, ti lascio, o cara").

The first complete recording with Max Emanuel Cenčić, Julia Lezhneva, Dilyara Idrisova, Hasnaa Bennani, Mary-Ellen Nesi, and the Capella Cracoviensis, conducted by Jan Tomasz Adamus, was issued on Decca in January 2018.

References

External links
 
 Complete libretto printed in 1732 for the premiere performance 
 Detailed synopsis from the Parnassus Arts touring production (2015/2016)

Italian-language operas
Operas by Nicola Porpora
1732 operas
Operas
Operas based on real people
Operas set in antiquity
Operas set in Italy
Operas set in Germany
Cultural depictions of Germanicus